Dziewicza Góra is a hill close to Czerwonak, a few kilometres north-east of the city of Poznań in western Poland.

Its name (originally Dziewcza Góra) literally means Virgin Hill. It derives from the Cistercian nuns who were granted the hill in 1242.

This is used for forest fire observation, and is also open to the public at certain times, offering wide views of the surrounding countryside and the city of Poznań.

Tourist attractions in Greater Poland Voivodeship
Hills of Poland
Poznań County